Peter Richard Head CBE FREng is a civil and structural engineer. Since 2004, he led the global planning practice at Arup, UK. Currently, he is CEO of Ecological Sequestration Trust, based in London, UK.

Early life
Born in 1947, Peter was educated at the Imperial College London and graduated with a degree in Civil Engineering in 1969.

Career
In 1980, Peter joined Maunsell Group and later became its CEO in 2001. While there,
he pioneered the use of composite materials for bridges. Later, Peter joined Arup UK 
in 2004, working on civil and structural engineering projects for Asia, Europe, North America and
the Middle east. While at Arup, he was involved in the Dongtan Eco-City urban work.

Awards
Peter was elected to the Royal Academy of Engineering in 1996 and awarded the International Award of Merit in Structural Engineering by the International Association for Bridge and Structural Engineering in 1998. He was honoured with an OBE in the 1998 New Year Honours. He received an Honorary Doctor of Engineering degree from the University of Bristol, UK in 2008. In 2009, he was awarded the Sir Frank Whittle Medal by the Royal Academy of Engineering, UK. In the 2011 New Year Honours, Peter was elevated to CBE for services to civil engineering and the environment.

References 

1947 births
Living people
British civil engineers
Alumni of Imperial College London
Fellows of the Royal Academy of Engineering
Commanders of the Order of the British Empire